Write to Death is a series of EPs from American rapper Illogic. Write to Death 1 was released in August 2003 and Write to Death 2 was released in February 2006.

Write to Death 1

Write to Death 2

References

External links
 Official website

2003 EPs
2006 EPs
Alternative hip hop EPs
Illogic albums
Albums produced by Blockhead (music producer)
EP series